Douglas Watkins (March 2, 1934 – February 5, 1962) was an American jazz double bassist. He was best known for being an accompanist to various hard bop artists in the Detroit area, including Donald Byrd and Jackie McLean.

Biography
Watkins was born in Detroit, Michigan, United States. An original member of the Jazz Messengers, he later played in Horace Silver's quintet and freelanced with Gene Ammons, Kenny Burrell, Donald Byrd, Art Farmer, Jackie McLean, Hank Mobley, Lee Morgan, Sonny Rollins, and Phil Woods among others.

Some of Watkins' best-known work can be heard, when as a 22-year-old, he appeared on the 1956 album Saxophone Colossus by tenor saxophonist Sonny Rollins, with Max Roach and Tommy Flanagan.

According to Horace Silver's autobiography, Let's Get to the Nitty Gritty, Watkins, along with Silver, later left Art Blakey's Jazz Messengers because the other members of the band at the time (Kenny Dorham, Hank Mobley and Blakey) had serious drug problems, whereas Watkins and Silver were tired of being harassed and searched by the police every time they went to a gig in a new city and club.

When Charles Mingus briefly ventured over to the piano stool in 1961, he hired Watkins to take over the bass part; Oh Yeah and Tonight at Noon were the results.

Watkins recorded only two albums as leader: Watkins at Large for Transition; and Soulnik for New Jazz. The latter, recorded in 1960, with Yusef Lateef, features Watkins on cello with Herman Wright backing him on bass. The cello was an instrument he had started to play only a few days before the recording session.

Watkins died in an automobile accident near Holbrook, Arizona, on February 5, 1962, while traveling from Arizona to San Francisco to meet drummer Philly Joe Jones for a gig.

Discography

As leader
 1956: Watkins at Large (Transition)
 1960: Soulnik (New Jazz)

As sideman

With Pepper Adams
Baritones and French Horns (Prestige, 1957)
Critic's Choice (World Pacific, 1957)
The Pepper-Knepper Quintet (MetroJazz, 1958) with Jimmy Knepper
10 to 4 at the 5 Spot (Riverside, 1958)
With Gene Ammons
Jammin' with Gene (Prestige, 1956)
Funky (Prestige, 1957)
Blue Gene (Prestige, 1958)
Boss Tenor (Prestige, 1960)
Velvet Soul (Prestige, 1960 [1964])
Angel Eyes (Prestige, 1960 [1965])
Nice an' Cool (Moodsville, 1961)
Jug (Prestige, 1961)
With Art Blakey
At the Cafe Bohemia, Vol. 1 (Blue Note, 1955)
At the Cafe Bohemia, Vol. 2 (Blue Note, 1955)
 Originally (Columbia, 1956 [1982]) 
With Tina Brooks
Minor Move (Blue Note, 1958)
With Kenny Burrell
All Night Long (Prestige, 1956)
All Day Long (Prestige, 1957)
Kenny Burrell (Prestige, 1957)
K. B. Blues (Blue Note, 1957 [1979])
2 Guitars - with Jimmy Raney (Prestige, 1957)
With Donald Byrd
Byrd's Eye View (Transition, 1955)
Byrd Blows on Beacon Hill (Transition, 1956)
2 Trumpets (Prestige, 1956) - with Art Farmer
Jazz Eyes (Regent, 1957) - with John Jenkins
Byrd in Paris (Brunswick, 1958)
Parisian Thoroughfare (Brunswick, 1958)
Fuego (Blue Note, 1959)
Byrd in Flight (Blue Note, 1960)
Chant (Blue Note, 1961)
With John Coltrane
Dakar (Prestige, 1957 [1963])
With Tommy Flanagan
The Cats (Prestige, 1957)
With Curtis Fuller
New Trombone (Prestige, 1957)
With Red Garland
Coleman Hawkins with the Red Garland Trio (Swingville, 1959)
Satin Doll (Prestige, 1959 [1971])
Rediscovered Masters (Prestige, 1959 [1977])
With Benny Golson
Gettin' with It (New Jazz, 1959)
With Bill Hardman 
Saying Something (Savoy 1961)
With Wilbur Harden
Mainstream 1958 (Savoy, 1958)
With Thad Jones
Mad Thad (Period, 1957)
Olio (Prestige, 1957)
With Yusef Lateef
Jazz for the Thinker (Savoy, 1957)
Jazz Mood (Savoy, 1957)
With Jackie McLean
Presenting... Jackie McLean (Ad Lib, 1955)
Lights Out! (Prestige, 1956)
4, 5 and 6 (Prestige, 1956)
Jackie McLean & Co. (Prestige, 1957)
Alto Madness (Prestige, 1957) - with John Jenkins
Bluesnik (Blue Note, 1961)
With Charles Mingus
Oh Yeah (Atlantic, 1961)
Tonight at Noon (Atlantic, 1961)
With Hank Mobley
Hank Mobley Quartet (Blue Note, 1955)
The Jazz Message of Hank Mobley (Savoy, 1956)
Mobley's Message (Prestige, 1956)
Mobley's 2nd Message (Prestige, 1956)
Jazz Message No. 2 (Savoy, 1956)
Hank Mobley and his All Stars (Blue Note, 1957)
Hank Mobley Quintet (Blue Note, 1957)
With Lee Morgan
Introducing Lee Morgan (Savoy, 1956)
Candy (Blue Note, 1957)
With The Prestige All Stars
Wheelin' & Dealin' (Prestige, 1957)
With Paul Quinichette
On the Sunny Side (Prestige, 1957)
With Dizzy Reece
Soundin' Off (Blue Note, 1960)
With Rita Reys
The Cool Voice of Rita Reys (Columbia, 1956)
With Sonny Rollins
Saxophone Colossus (Prestige, 1956)
Newk's Time (Blue Note, 1957)
With Horace Silver
Horace Silver and the Jazz Messengers (Blue Note, 1955)
Silver's Blue (Columbia, 1956)
6 Pieces of Silver (Blue Note, 1956)
With Louis Smith
Here Comes Louis Smith (Blue Note, 1957)
With Idrees Sulieman
Roots (New Jazz, 1958) with the Prestige All Stars
With Billy Taylor
Interlude (Moodsville, 1961)
With Phil Woods
Pairing Off (Prestige, 1956)

References

1934 births
1962 deaths
African-American musicians
American jazz double-bassists
Male double-bassists
The Jazz Messengers members
Blue Note Records artists
Prestige Records artists
Musicians from Detroit
20th-century American musicians
Jazz musicians from Michigan
20th-century double-bassists
American male jazz musicians
20th-century American male musicians